Sclareol is a fragrant chemical compound found in Salvia sclarea, from which it derives its name.  It is classified as a bicyclic diterpene alcohol. It is an amber colored solid with a sweet, balsamic scent.  Sclareol is also able to kill human leukemic cells and colon cancer cells by apoptosis.

References

Diols
Diterpenes
Vinyl compounds
Decalins